Octavian Utalea (11 February 1868, Maieru, Beszterce-Naszód, Kingdom of Hungary – present-day Bistrița-Năsăud County, Romania – ?) became mayor of the municipality of Cluj, Romania on 1 May 1923. He served as mayor until 14 March 1926. Among the accomplishments of his term in office were the opening of an Army Club (Cerc Militar) in the Reduta Palace and the founding of a School of Fine Arts (today's School of Plastic Arts) in the Central Park.

He took classes at the law faculty of Cluj's Hungarian University, graduating in 1906. He followed a military career and was very active in the national liberation movement of Transylvania's Romanians, being present at the Great National Assembly of 1 December 1918. Aside from being mayor of Cluj, he held other administrative functions, for instance being prefect of Cluj County for a short time.

He was a member of ASTRA and also of the Virtus Romana Rediviva lecture society.

See also 
 List of mayors of Cluj-Napoca

1868 births
Year of death missing
19th-century Romanian people
20th-century Romanian people
Mayors of Cluj-Napoca
Franz Joseph University alumni
Ethnic Romanian politicians in Transylvania
People from Bistrița-Năsăud County
Prefects of Romania